César Antonio Ledesma Turbí (born 4 June 1990) is a Dominican international footballer who plays as a right full-back.

Career
Ledesma has played for Young Boys II and FC Biel-Bienne.

International career
He made his international debut for Dominican Republic in 2011, and has appeared in FIFA World Cup qualifying matches.

References

1990 births
Living people
Dominican Republic footballers
Dominican Republic international footballers
Dominican Republic expatriate footballers
Dominican Republic expatriate sportspeople in Switzerland
Expatriate footballers in Switzerland
Association football defenders
FC Münsingen players